Sydney Selwyn (7 November 1934 – 8 November 1996) was a British physician, medical scientist, and professor. 
He was a medical microbiologist with an interest in bacteriology, authority on the history of medicine, avid collector, writer, lecturer, world traveller, and occasional radio and TV broadcaster.

Life

Sydney Selwyn was born in Leeds, 7 November 1934 and died in London, 8 November 1996.

Selwyn's parents owned and ran a butcher shop in Leeds and originally expected him to follow them in their trade or at least something similar. He chose instead to devote his life to science and academia.  As a working-class boy growing up in England in the 1930s, and during World War II, it was a great achievement for him to win a scholarship to be educated at the prestigious and ancient Leeds Grammar School. He then went on to study at the University of Edinburgh from which he graduated with a BSc, MB ChB, and gained an MD in hospital infection.

He worked briefly (from 1959–1960) as a house physician in Edinburgh City Hospital before becoming a lecturer in bacteriology at University of Edinburgh Medical School (1961–1966). In 1967 he became one of the youngest-ever visiting professors for the World Health Organization (WHO) at Baroda University in India, as well as a WHO SE Asia medical consultant. He toured India extensively, visiting not only towns and cities but also many remote rural areas as part of his WHO project to greatly improve the standards of health and hygiene at various hospitals. He returned from India to become first Reader, then Consultant and finally Professor of Medical Microbiology at Westminster Medical School, University of London.

Whilst continuing as Professor at Westminster Medical School he also simultaneously became Professor of Medical Microbiology at Charing Cross Hospital Medical School, thus running two separate departments (each with its own research and teaching teams) in two different teaching hospitals.

During the 1970s and 1980s he played a significant role as a pioneer in the field of bone marrow transplantation. In particular he was closely involved with the treatment of two ground-breaking cases; those of Simon Bostic and  Anthony Nolan. Anthony Nolan's mother went on to found the charitable Anthony Nolan Trust.

Research in the fields of bacteriology and medical microbiology were not his only professional interests. Despite his demanding research activities he also developed world-class expertise in the history and development of medicine, from the dawn of civilisation to the then present day, and also became a distinguished and popular lecturer in that subject.

He was honorary archivist of the Royal College of Pathology of which he was also a Fellow (FRCPath), President of the Faculty of History and Philosophy of Medicine and Pharmacy president of the Medical Sciences Historical Society and a Liveryman of the Society of Apothecaries Worshipful where he was also Director of the DHMSA (the Diploma of the History of Medicine at the Society of Apothecaries), an important and popular course and diploma, to which some students even flew in from across Europe (and one from Canada) each week to attend! He led this course to new heights of popularity over the seventeen years of his tenure, until ill health forced his retirement in 1990.

He was an active member of many prestigious research and educationally based clubs and organisations, for example being President of the Osler Club of London and President of the Harveian Society of London (1991–92).

Writer

He wrote, as well as co-authored, a number of books and a great number of scientific papers. One of his most accessible and delightful publications (in collaboration with his predecessor Professor R W Lacey and research assistant and colleague Mohammed Bakhtiar) was "The beta-lactam antibiotics: penicillins and cephalosporins in perspective."

Design for a banknote

His diverse interests in many fields often led to involvement in unusual projects both large and small. For example, as an authority on the history of medicine he was approached by the Bank of England to suggest a medical theme for the £10 note. He not only suggested Florence Nightingale as a subject but went on to recommend they base their design on a "classic" scene of her carrying her famous lamp, which had earned her the nickname "The Lady with the Lamp," around a ward of the Military Hospital at Scutari during the Crimean War. When the Bank of England was unable to track down the particular steel engraving he had recommended he lent them a copy of the rare print from his collection.

The Florence Nightingale £10 banknote was first issued in February 1975 and proved extremely popular (leading for a while to the £10 note being nicknamed "a Flo" by some, as in "excuse me – have you got change for a Flo"). It was not withdrawn until May 1994.

Broadcasts

Following several brief but popular broadcasts he gave on the dangers of licking postage stamps (particularly in countries that used crude forms of "cow gum" made from bones that could contain a worrying variety of still active diseases) he was consulted by De La Rue and the Walsall Security Printing companies who were early pioneers of self-adhesive stamps. One of the resulting projects he became involved with was the development of a set of self adhesive stamps featuring historic post boxes for Gibraltar.

He appeared a number of times as "a medical expert" on television. For example, in the 1970s he was interviewed by Frank Bough on the BBC's then popular "Nationwide" programme shown on prime family-time TV.  Selwyn introduced himself on the programme as a microbiologist and bacteriologist with an interest in dermatological matters such as the flora and fauna of our skin. He went on to explain that through his researches he had come to realise most of us were using far too many chemical-based cosmetics and, as a result, disrupting the ecology of our skin. This resulted, he said, in building-up a dependence on more of these otherwise unnecessary cosmetics. He suggested that clean water and small amounts of simple soap were ample and that most of the available cosmetics and personal hygiene products being advertised were not just unnecessary but also potentially harmful especially through habitual over use.

He worked with the BBC on a number of projects which included, for example, "Horizon" documentaries and "Microbes and Men" (1974).

Last years and final illness

Whilst barely in his 50s Professor Selwyn was diagnosed as suffering from "multiple system atrophy" (MSA), and told he might have only around 5–9 years left to live. However, even after being forced to take early retirement several years later he continued to write and publish in addition to travelling.

Despite his physical decline during his last decade or so he managed to retain not only his dignity and sense of humour but his passion for life also. Refusing to lose his mobility or become passive he instead delighted in learning to drive a new electrically driven self-propelled wheelchair. Eventually, as his condition worsened he lost his ability to speak, but, again undaunted, he learned to communicate by typing a single letter at a time on his lightwriter which had a built-in voice synthesiser.

He enjoyed a private family party in his honour for his 62nd birthday and was as full of enthusiasm and humour as ever (though of course had some difficulty in expressing it). He died peacefully at home later the following day.

Memorials

A room in the laboratory block of the Charing Cross Hospital (now part of Imperial College) used for both meetings and teaching or training has been named "The Sydney Selwyn Room" in his memory. His photograph and a plaque summarising his contribution to the hospital is displayed on the wall.

Each year "The Selwyn Prize" is awarded by The Faculty of History And Philosophy of Medicine and Pharmacy at the historic premises of the Worshipful Society of Apothecaries in London to the best candidate from the previous year in the examination for the Diploma in the  Ethics and Philosophy of Healthcare (Philosophy of Medicine). Receiving this prize, which is usually presented at the  John Locke Lecture, is an impressive achievement as the standard and quality of candidates entering the examination is generally very high.

The winner of the 2021 Sydney Selwyn Lecture was Dr Lotte Elton.
With Dr Deniz Kaya & Dr Andrew Nanapragasam - both Highly Commended

Previous prize winners are:
 2020 - Dr Mary Fletcher
 2019 - Dr Sara Dahlen
 2018 - Dr Tina Matthews
 2016 - Daniel Di Francesco
 2012 - Miss Evelyn Brown
 2010 - Dr Margaret Baker

 2009 – Christopher Mark Crawshaw
 2008 – Dr. Katherine Elen Catford
 2007 – Michael Trent Herdman
 2006 – Paul Bingham & Edith Rom
 2005 – Caroline Bagley & Ben Whitelaw
 2004 – Robert Ali

See also
 MSA (Multiple system Atrophy)

References

Further reading
 The beta-lactam antibiotics: penicillins and cephalosporins in perspective by Sydney Selwyn; R W Lacey; Mohammed Bakhtiar / London : Hodder and Stoughton, 1980

External links

 President of the Osler Club (1991–92)
 library and resource centre
 Bartholomew's Hospital London
 The Selwyn prize is awarded to the best candidate in the examination for the Diploma in the Philosophy of Medicine and it is usually presented at the John Locke Lecture.
 (Alternative copy of obituary by Robin Price)
 Google Scholar – links to some publications by the late Prof S Selwyn
 Gibraltar self-adhesive stamps 1974
 cvphm.org
 Walsall Security Printers Limited (WSP)
 A bust in bronze of Prof S Selwyn was produced in 1982 from live sittings by NIGEL BOONHAM (a well-known British sculptor who has had many important commissions to sculpt many famous people including a bronze of Diana, Princess of Wales that was unveiled by the Princess herself at the National Hospital of Neurology)
 Further information including more external links
 Frank Bough former presenter for the BBC, including of "Nationwide"
 The Anthony Nolan Trust a charitable organisation devoted to supporting all those with immune system disorders.

20th-century English medical doctors
English scientists
English medical historians
1934 births
1996 deaths
Alumni of the University of Edinburgh
People educated at Leeds Grammar School
Medical doctors from Yorkshire
Neurological disease deaths in England
Deaths from multiple system atrophy
Academics of the University of Edinburgh
Academics of the University of London
British microbiologists
20th-century English historians
Presidents of the Osler Club of London